This is the list of recipients for the Special Achievement in Animation Annie Award.

Honorees

2020s
2021:  Glenn Vilppu

2020: Howard

2010s
2017: Cuphead

2016: Life, Animated

2015:  The Walt Disney Family Museum

2014: Creative Talent Network (CTN) Animation eXpo

2011: Depth Analysis

2000s
2009: Martin Meunier and Brian McLean

2007: Edwin R. Leonard – Promoting the use of Linux in animation studios and video game development

2000:  Bob Clampett's Beany and Cecil The Special Edition, Robert Clampett Jr.

See also
Winsor McCay Award

References

External links
Annie Awards

Annie Awards
Awards established in 2000